The Samaleswari Express is an Express train belonging to South Eastern Railway zone that runs between  and  in India. It is currently being operated with 18005/18006 train numbers on a daily basis.

Service

The 18005/Samaleswari Express has an average speed of 46 km/hr and covers 1165 km in 25h 15m. The 18006/Samaleswari Express has an average speed of 45 km/hr and covers 1165 km in 25h 55m.

Route and halts 

The important halts of the train are:

Coach composition

The train has LHB rakes with a max speed of 130 kmph. The train consists of 19 coaches:

 1 First AC
 2 AC II Tier
 3 AC III Tier
 6 Sleeper coaches
 5 General Unreserved
 1 Luggage Rake
 1 EOG

Traction

As the route is electrified both trains are hauled by a Visakhapatnam Loco Shed-based WAP-7 HOG equipped electric locomotive from end to end .

Direction reversal

The train reverses its direction 2 times:

See also 
 Howrah Junction railway station
 Jagdalpur railway station

Notes

References

External links 
 18005/Samaleswari Express India Rail Info
 18006/Samaleswari Express India Rail Info

Rail transport in Howrah
Transport in Jagdalpur
Named passenger trains of India
Rail transport in West Bengal
Rail transport in Jharkhand
Rail transport in Odisha
Rail transport in Chhattisgarh
Express trains in India